ISO 639-6, Codes for the representation of names of languages — Part 6: Alpha-4 code for comprehensive coverage of language variants, was a proposed international standard in the ISO 639 series, developed by ISO/TC 37/SC 2 (International Organization for Standardization, Technical Committee 37, Subcommittee 2: Terminographical and lexicographical working methods – later renamed to Terminology workflow and language coding).  It contained four-letter codes that denote variants of languages and language families. This allowed one to differentiate between, for example, historical (glvx) versus revived (rvmx) Manx, while ISO 639-3 only includes glv for Manx.

The data supporting ISO 639-6 was researched and compiled by the ISO's registration authority GeoLang.  ISO 639-6 was published on 17November 2009, and withdrawn on 25November 2014 because of concerns about its usefulness and maintainability.  The database also links each language and family to its principal ancestor, allowing the user to follow the classification of various languages.  For example, the codes and ancestry of English is given below:

The database differentiated between different scripts used for the same language.  For example, a number of different scripts were used in the Ottoman Empire and as a result the Ottoman Turkish language has been categorized as follows:

See also
 List of ISO 639-6 codes
ISO 639-5: 3-letter codes for language families and groups ("remainder" groups from legacy ISO 639-2 were extended inclusively in ISO 639-5).
ISO 15924: 4-letter codes for the representation of names of scripts (most of them also used in BCP 47 as "script subtags").
IETF language tag: 5-to-8-letter codes used as "variant subtags", assigned and maintained in the IANA database for BCP 47 language tags.

References

ISO 639
2009 introductions
Language identifiers